Gilbert Garcin (21 June 1929 – 17 April 2020) was a French photographer.

Biography 
Gilbert Garcin was born in La Ciotat in June 1929. He was not particularly interested in photography, and managed a factory which sold lamps. When he retired, he participated in a photography contest, and won the first prize, which allowed him to go to a Photomontage training course organized by the photographer Pascal Dolémieux during the Rencontres d'Arles in 1992.

The technique fascinated him, and he began at 65 years old a photographer career, always using the same technique in a rather surrealist technique. He became very well known worldwide for his very particular style.

Technique 
His photographs always used papercuts of his own figure and sometimes the figure of his wife, integrated in a surreal background.

References

External links
 Photographer website
 "Tout peut arriver, Gilbert Garcin", documentary from Ralf Kämpfe, at Rencontres d'Arles, 2013, 10 min.

1929 births
2020 deaths
Photography in France
French photographers